Edward Rushton (1756–1814) was a British poet, writer and bookseller from Liverpool, England. He worked as a sailor aboard a slave ship as a young man, and became an abolitionist as a result. After losing his own vision, he opened a school for the blind, the oldest such school in continuous operation in the world.

Early life
Edward Rushton was born in Liverpool, Lancashire, England on 13 November 1756. He was enrolled at the Liverpool Free School from the age of 6 until the age of 9. He left school and at the age of 11 he became an apprentice with Messrs. Watt and Gregson, a firm that traded in the West Indies.

Life at sea
Rushton quickly became an experienced sailor. For example, at age 16, he took the helm of a ship which the captain and crew were about to abandon and guided them safely back to Liverpool. Because of this event, he was promoted from his apprenticeship to the position of second mate. In addition, at the age of 17 he survived the sinking of a slave ship he was aboard while on the way back from Guinea.

Working with human cargo gave Rushton first-hand experience with the ways that slaves were treated, and caused him to become an abolitionist later in life. In 1773, the same year that he survived the ship sinking, Rushton was sailing to Dominica with human cargo when a highly contagious outbreak of ophthalmia struck many of the slaves. The disease spread quickly and Rushton was appalled with the conditions that the slaves had to endure, so he would sneak food and water to them. He also reprimanded the captain, and because of this he was ultimately charged with mutiny. However, his contact with the slaves during the outbreak caused him to contract ophthalmia himself, and he became completely blind in his left eye and developed a cataract-like condition in his right eye.

Abolitionist and literary career in Liverpool
Unable to sail because of his blindness, Rushton returned to Liverpool and moved in with his sister. He was supported financially by his father, and hired local boys to come read to him every week. He began to learn more about politics and philosophy, and started writing about these topics through dictation to the boys. His first poem, The Dismembered Empire, was published in 1782. In it, he criticised British rulers using the framework of the American War. Rushton also wrote letters to his heroes George Washington and Thomas Paine to ask why they were not using their public influence to oppose slavery, but neither man replied.

Rushton was married in 1784 to Isabelle Rain. His father tried to set him up to run a tavern and make some money, but he was unsuited to the work and continued to write. His rhetorical battle against the slave trade continued with The West Indian Eclogues, a poem which was published in 1787. Rushton continued writing, using his firsthand experience with the slave trade and other experiences at sea for inspiration. His poetry became popular and he gained a reputation as a radical abolitionist author. Thomas Clarkson even personally sought out Rushton to credit his contribution to the abolitionist movement.

Soon after the publication of The West Indian Eclogues, Rushton became the editor of the Liverpool Herald. However, this was short-lived due to his radical ideals. When Rushton's partner suggested that he retract a particularly radical editorial, Rushton resigned. This incident inspired the poem Will Clewline. He tried to become a bookseller as well, but his outspoken views did nothing but gain him enemies. Rushton made no attempts to censor his radical beliefs about the French Revolution or the social unrest in Britain.

Work with the blind
Eventually, Rushton was able to make enough money from bookselling to live comfortably and educate his children. In the late 1780s, he became a member of the literary and philosophical society and began donating money to help blind paupers. This led to Rushton establishing the Liverpool School for the Indigent Blind, which opened in 1791, second only in the world to the Paris school. The school now exists under the name of The Royal School for the Blind, Liverpool.

In 1807, Rushton had an operation which allowed him to regain his sight. For the first time in 33 years, he was able to see his wife and children. In 1811, his wife Isabella and one of his daughters both died. Rushton died on 22 November 1814 of paralysis in Liverpool, Lancashire, England (UK).

Collected works
1782 – The Dismembered Empire.
1787 – West-Indian eclogues
1788 – Neglected genius: or, Tributary stanzas to the memory of the unfortunate Chatterton
1797 – Expostulatory Letter to George Washington, of Mount Vernon, in Virginia, on his continuing to be a proprietor of slaves
1800 – Lucy's ghost. A marine ballad
1801 – Will Clewline
1806 – Poems
1824 – Poems and Other Writings, ed. William Shepherd.

Legacy
Edward Rushton appeared as a featured character in "The Dark," an interactive installation hosted at the Dana Centre of the Science Museum, London in 2004. The work, described as "a specially created three-dimensional audio environment in which the echoes of virtual ghosts inhabited a haunted soundscape," enables visitors to "experience life on board a slave ship in the 18th century." As of 2012, "The Dark" is also available online as an interactive web site. In March 2016, the play Unsung has its premiere at the Everyman Theatre, Liverpool. It tells the story of how his friendship with a former African slave changes his life.

See also
 List of 18th-century British working-class writers
 List of abolitionist forerunners

References

 Forgotten Hero – The Life and Times of Edward Rushton, Liverpool's Blind Poet, Revolutionary Republican & Anti-Slavery Fighter
 10 January 1791: Liverpool School for the Blind opens, initiated by Edward Rushton (see also July 1796)
 Forgotten Hero? But not by us! By Bill Hunter. Reviewed by Ritchie Hunter
 Rushton, Edward (1756–1814), Nottingham Trent University, School of Arts & Humanities – Labouring-Class Writers Project
 (Rushton , Writing 1814–1855 Liverpool City)
 (Link by Rushton Arts & Humanities Project)
 
 W. Shepherd, (Memoir of Edward Rushton:) Poems and other writings – with a sketch of a life of the Author (1824)
 Mary G. Thomas, Edward Rushton, N.I.B. Biographies No.1 (1949)
 Michael W. Royden, Pioneers and Perseverance (1991) pp. 25–39, p. 262, portrait p.ix, print p. 12, bust p. 27.
 H. Smithers, Liverpool, its Commerce, Statistics and Institutions (1825); Edward Rushton Jnr, Biographical Sketch of Edward Rushton, Belfast Magazine (Dec 1814)
 W.L. Rushton, Edward Rushton Jnr – Letters of a Templar (1820–1850) (1903)
 Proctor, Literary Reminiscences (1860) p. 141
 T.W.M. Lund, Blindness, or Some Thoughts for Sighted People (Sermon preached in the Chapel of the Royal School for the Blind Liverpool, 20 February 1887) (includes Appendix A, A Sketch of the Life of Edward Rushton, the Blind Poet (1887
 Sir J.A. Picton, Memorials of Liverpool (1878) vol I p. 426, vol II p. 166, 215
 Bowker, Liverpool Celebrities (1876)
 Bannister, Worthies of the Working Classes (1854) p. 7
 Frazier Guide to Liverpool and Birkenhead (1855) pp. 289–292)

External links
 

1756 births
1814 deaths
British poets
British disability rights activists
English abolitionists
Poets from Liverpool
English blind people
Blind politicians
Blind writers
British male poets